Feicheng is a county-level city under the administration of Tai'an City in the west of Shandong Province, China. , the population was 992,000. Part of the Great Wall of Qi starts here and is listed on the People's Republic of China's list of cultural artifacts.

Billionaire businessman Xiao Jianhua grew up in Feicheng.

Administrative divisions
As 2012, this city is divided to 3 subdistricts and 11 towns.
Subdistricts
Xincheng Subdistrict
Laocheng Subdistrict
Wangguadian Subdistrict

Towns

Climate

References

External links 
Official homepage（in English）

 
County-level divisions of Shandong
Cities in Shandong
Tai'an